Joan of Burgundy, or variants, may refer to:

Joan I, Countess of Burgundy (1191-1205)
Jeanne de Bourgogne (1200–1223), daughter of Odo III, Duke of Burgundy
Joan II, Countess of Burgundy (c.1291–1330), Queen of France
Joan the Lame (1293–1349), Queen of France
Joan III, Countess of Burgundy (1308–1347)